Kosarkaški klub Beovuk 72, commonly referred to as KK Beovuk 72, is basketball club based in Belgrade, Serbia. The team is currently competing in the Second Basketball League of Serbia.

Players

Coaches

  Ivan Jeremić (1990–1992)
  Aleksandar Petrović
  Milan Lakić (1994–1995)
  Mile Protić (1996–1997)
  Aleksandar Džikić (1997–1999)
  Srđan Flajs (2000–2003)
  Milenko Bogićević (2004–2007)
  Dušan Milojević (2007–2009)
  Nebojša Andrić (2009–2011)
  Nikola Stanić (2011–2014)
  Rajko Mirkovic (2014–2017)
  Slobodan Srezoski (2018)
  Rajko Mirković (2018–2019)
  Nikola Stanić (2019–2021)
  Rajko Mirković (2021–2022)
  Nikola Paunović (2022-present)

Notable players

  Dejan Milojević
  Ognjen Aškrabić
  Predrag Savović
  Boban Savović
  Aleksandar Glintić
  Vladimir Štimac
  Nenad Šulović
  Marko Špica
  Nikola Marković
  Stefan Fundić
  Zhao Xuxin

External links
 
 Team Profile at kls.rs
 Profile at eurobasket.com

Basketball teams in Belgrade
Basketball teams established in 1972
Basketball teams in Yugoslavia
1972 establishments in Serbia